Harry R. Dinnel Jr. (October 9, 1940August 26, 2017) was an American basketball player and coach.

Dinnel was born and died in Los Angeles, California.

Dinnel played basketball at Pepperdine University.

Dinnel was drafted in the 8th round of the 1963 NBA draft by the San Francisco Warriors.

Dinnel later played for, and then coached, the Anaheim Amigos of the American Basketball Association.

In 1981 Dinnel was inducted into the Pepperdine Athletics Hall of Fame.

References

External links
basketball-reference.com page on Harry Dinnel
DatabaseBasketball.com reference page on Harry Dinnel

1940 births
2017 deaths
Anaheim Amigos coaches
Anaheim Amigos players
El Camino College alumni
Junior college men's basketball players in the United States
Pepperdine Waves men's basketball players
Player-coaches
San Francisco Warriors draft picks
American men's basketball players
Forwards (basketball)
Guards (basketball)
People from Venice, Los Angeles